The badminton women's doubles tournament at the 1998 Asian Games in Bangkok took place from 13 December to 17 December at Thammasat Gymnasium 2.

The Chinese duo of Ge Fei and Gu Jun won the gold in this tournament.

Schedule
All times are Indochina Time (UTC+07:00)

Results
Legend
WO — Won by walkover

References
Results

External links
World Ranking, December 1st 1998

Women's doubles